The 2001 Speedway World Cup Qualifying round 2 was the second race of the 2001 Speedway World Cup season. It took place on July 2, 2001 in the Speedway Stadium in Gdańsk, Poland.

Results

Heat details

Heat after heat 
 B.Andersen, Rickardsson, Mardanszin, Klenovsek
 M.Karlsson, Jensen, Kolenko, Poważnyj
 Darkin, Santej, Klingberg, N.Pedersen
 Nilsen, Clausen, Ferjan, Szajchulin
 B.Pedersen, Jonsson, Kuzin, Legan
 N.Pedersen, M.Karlsson, Szajchulin, Klenovsek
 Rickardsson, Clausen, Darkin, Kolenko
 B.Andersen, Poważnyj, Nilsen, Santej
 Jensen, Ferjan, Klingberg, Mardanszin
 Jonsson, Kuzin, B.Pedersen, Legan
 Poważnyj, Klingberg, Santej, Clausen
 N.Pedersen, Nilsen, Kolenko, Mardanszin
 Rickardsson, Jensen, Santej, Szajchulin
 M.Karlsson, Darkin, B.Andersen, Ferjan
 Jonsson, B.Pedersen, Kuzin, Legan
 Poważnyj, Klingberg, B.Andersen, Kolenko
 Darkin, Nilsen, Jensen, Klenovsek
 N.Pedersen (joker), M.Karlsson, Santej, Mardanszin
 Rickardsson, Poważnyj, N.Pedersen, Ferjan (Fx)
 Jonsson, Kolenko, B.Pedersen, Kuzin
 Nilsen, B.Andersen, Szajchulin (joker), Kolenko (F2)
 Jensen, M.Karlsson, Kuzin, Ferjan
 Jonsson, Darkin, Jensen, Ferjan
 Rickardsson, N.Pedersen, Poważnyj, Santej

See also 
 Motorcycle speedway

References 

E2